Acton GO Station is a railway station in Acton, Ontario, Canada. It is served by GO Transit's Kitchener line. It is located at the intersection of Mill St East and Eastern Avenue, adjacent to the Old Hide House. Previous Acton stations were operated by the Grand Trunk Railway and, later, the Canadian National Railway.

History

The previous station building near this site in Acton had been constructed in 1908 by the Grand Trunk Railway with the origin of the line dating back to 1856. The line ultimately became part of the Canadian National Railway system and regular service to the town was discontinued in 1967. GO Trains had also stopped at the station for a brief time between 1990 and 1993.

The new Acton station was approved as part of the Georgetown-to-Kitchener Extension Environmental Assessment in 2009.  In November 2010, a partial rollout of this plan was announced to be in place by late 2011. Two round trips daily were planned to serve Acton, Guelph and Kitchener with layover for those trains at a small facility in Kitchener. $18 million would be spent to get this first stage operational, with further upgrades to come. Service to Guelph and Kitchener began on December 19, 2011, but trains passed through Acton without stopping, as the Acton station was not ready.

Trains began serving the Acton station on January 7, 2013.

References

External links

Buildings and structures in the Regional Municipality of Halton
Railway stations in the Regional Municipality of Halton
GO Transit railway stations
Railway stations in Canada opened in 2013
2013 establishments in Ontario